Canadian Bushplane Heritage Centre (CBHC), located on the north bank of the St. Marys River in Sault Ste. Marie, Ontario, Canada, is dedicated to preserving the history of bush flying and forest protection in Canada. It was founded in 1987 by a group of local volunteers to preserve the province's history in bush planes and aerial firefighting.

The CBHC has a  hangar containing more than thirty aircraft exhibits. It is now also home to the Entomica Insectarium.

History

The museum occupies a historically significant air base first established by the Ontario Provincial Air Service in 1924. The Centre's operating revenues are derived from sales from the gift shop, admission fees, and membership dues. The centre does not rely on operating support from the public funds, though corporate costs associated with artifacts and displays have been partially funded through corporate donations and tourist infrastructure programmes. Continued support ensures a strong future and on site development and expansion of the CBHC.

The centre also operates the Sault Ste. Marie Water Aerodrome.

Collection 
The museum's focus is on floatplanes, bush planes, waterbombers, and forest fire fighting equipment along with other aviation and forestry-related artifacts.

 AEA Silver Dart – replica
 Aeronca 11 Chief
 Aeronca Champion
 Beech 18
 Beech C-45
 Bell 47D
 Buhl CA-6 Air Sedan
 Buhl CA-6 Air Sedan
 Canadair CL-215
 Cessna 172
 de Havilland Canada DHC-2 Beaver
 de Havilland Canada DHC-3 Otter
 de Havilland Canada Turbo Beaver III
 de Havilland DH.83C Fox Moth – replica
 de Havilland DH.89 Dragon Rapide
 Fairchild F-11 Husky
 Fairchild KR-34
 Fokker F.VIIb-3m
 Fokker Super Universal
 Grumman CS2F Tracker
 MacGregor MG-65
 Noorduyn Norseman
 Noorduyn Norseman
 Republic RC-3 Seabee
 Saunders ST-27
 Stinson SR-9 Reliant
 Taylorcraft 20
 Thomas Esperanza

See also 
Virtual Museum of Canada
List of aerospace museums
 List of airports in the Sault Ste. Marie, Ontario area

References

External links 
 Official site

Aviation history of Canada
Aerospace museums in Ontario
Registered aerodromes in Ontario
Heliports in Ontario
Museums in Sault Ste. Marie, Ontario
Designated heritage properties in Ontario